The  Jacksonville Sharks season was the second season for the franchise in the Arena Football League. The team was coached by Les Moss and played their home games at Jacksonville Veterans Memorial Arena. In the regular season, the Sharks went 14–4, qualifying for the playoffs as the top seed in the American Conference. After defeating the Orlando Predators in the conference semifinals, they beat the Georgia Force in the American Conference championship. Advancing to ArenaBowl XXIV, the Sharks triumphed over the Arizona Rattlers on a last-second game-winning touchdown pass to win their first ArenaBowl championship.

Standings

Season schedule

Preseason

Regular season
The Sharks will begin the season on the road against the Arizona Rattlers on March 12. Their home opener will be on March 18 against the Georgia Force. They hosted the Spokane Shock in their final regular season game on July 22.

Playoffs

Regular season

Week 1: at Arizona Rattlers

Week 2: vs. Georgia Force

Week 3: vs. New Orleans VooDoo

Week 4: at Tampa Bay Storm

Week 5: BYE

Week 6: at Pittsburgh Power

Week 7: vs. Cleveland Gladiators

Week 8: vs. Orlando Predators

Week 9: at Philadelphia Soul

Week 10: vs. Iowa Barnstormers

Week 11: at Georgia Force

Week 12: BYE

Week 13: at New Orleans VooDoo

Week 14: at Orlando Predators

Week 15: vs. Milwaukee Mustangs

Week 16: vs. Tampa Bay Storm

Week 17: at San Jose SaberCats

Week 18: vs. Dallas Vigilantes

Week 19: at Kansas City Command

Week 20: vs. Spokane Shock

Playoffs

American Conference Semifinals: vs. (4) Orlando Predators

American Conference Championship: vs. (3) Georgia Force

ArenaBowl XXIV: at (N1) Arizona Rattlers

References

Jacksonville Sharks
Jacksonville Sharks seasons
ArenaBowl champion seasons
Jack